Bədirqala (also, Bedirka and Bedirkala) is a village and municipality in the Qusar Rayon of Azerbaijan.  It has a population of 723.

References 

Populated places in Qusar District